Alhambra Senior High School (AHS) is a public high school in Martinez, California, United States which was first established in 1897. It is a part of the Martinez Unified School District. During the 2006-2007 academic year, the school had enrollment of approximately 1400 students. Alhambra plays an active role in the community, with students participating in extracurricular sports, theatre, music, mentoring, and outreach programs as well as numerous community events. The school's mascot is "Spike" the bulldog, who can often be seen in appearances with "Spikette" at football games and rallies.

History
The public school district added a high school department, which was accredited by the state university. From 1895 to 1899, a private school replaced known as the Martinez Academy Then a private school took over and provided high school classes.

The discontinuance of the academy - apparently the private school business was financially precarious - left Martinez without a high school. (Contra Costa Gazette January 20, 1956) In July 1901, the Alhambra Union High School District was organized. It was the second of the present day high schools to be instituted and one of four organized in the same year.  Alhambra Union High School was established in 1901 according to the minutes of the school board meeting on July 31, 1901.  The school mascot was the Panther from 1927 until 1947 when they worked with the Antioch High School to keep the colors (blue and gold) and change their mascot to the Bulldogs. (see Contra Costa Gazette January 15, 1947)  These items of history are available on the website AlhambraAlumni.org , created and maintained by David Rich (class of 1973) and his wife Karen.

Diversity
According to the SARC report for the 2014-2015 school year, the student population is 55% White, 25.4% Latino, 2% African American, 3.8% Asian, 3.4% Filipino, 0.2% Native American, 0.5% Native Hawaiian or Pacific Islander, and 9.7% of two or more races.

Campus
Alhambra's campus was built into one of the Bay Area's characteristic rolling hills. The campus was renovated in 1994, and is now set in a Spanish style reminiscent of the old campus. In 2003, the Center for the Arts (Performing Arts Building or PAB) was completed, which seats 350 and plays host to theatrical and musical performances. This is a marked improvement for the school's drama department, which previously performed in the school's "multi-use room", a combination cafeteria and stage space. Most recently, the drama department received a new Black Box theater. The Center for the Arts also features rooms outside that are used to exhibit art. The Center for the Arts also has a large projector screen that can either hang down or retract into the ceiling above. This screen is often used for awareness programs for the students.

The school's synthetic field for football, baseball, soccer, and lacrosse borders the main avenue through town, and an all weather track, tennis courts and basketball are set on the top of a hill. The renovation also produced a large gym facility and a student commons.

All throughout the campus are student-made paintings on doors, walls, and seating areas. Often, the paintings are remakes of other famous paintings, but there are original works as well. For example, in between the F and H Buildings are low concrete walls with numerous flags from different countries painted on top. Some wall paintings depict famous people or musical instruments.

Academics
Alhambra Senior High 2012-13 State API score was 826 and the school or Student Groups scored at or above the statewide performance target of 800 in the 2012 Base.

In the 2008-2009 school year, 81% of Alhambra's total graduates enrolled in postsecondary institutions.

When comparing the Academic Performance Index, the SARC report found Alhambra to rank 8 out of 10 statewide in 2012-2013.

Athletics

The Alhambra student body sponsors the following sports programs: baseball, basketball, cheerleading, cross-country, football, golf, lacrosse, soccer, softball, swimming & diving, tennis, track & field, volleyball, water polo and wrestling.

The Bulldogs baseball team has had two notable players drafted in the MLB since 2010.

Robert Stephenson in 2011 was drafted in the first round, as number 27 overall selection out of Alhambra by the Cincinnati Reds. He is currently playing in major league baseball.

During the 1997-1998 school year, the Bulldogs won their division and lost in the conference championship game to Granada High School.

The football program had an off year for rebuilding in the 1998-1999 season, but bounced back in 1999-2000. Since the 2000 football team won their division, they went on to the state conference championship game against Foothill High School. In the 2009-2010 season, Alhambra went to the championship game, losing to Marin Catholic High School, but finishing with a record of 11-2.

Performing arts
Alhambra has a drama and performing arts center which was constructed in 2002. AHS has a marching band, flag team/colorguard, drumline, concert band, jazz band, and orchestra. The drama department puts on one non-musical play in the fall, and one musical in the spring. The marching band plays at all home football games, competes in WBA, and participates in parades.

Julianne George was originally the conductor of all bands and orchestras, but is now being conducted by Sara Stafford. Gerard Wiener is the drama teacher and director. The Drama Department has put on shows including Cabaret, The Pirates of Penzance, The Diary of Anne Frank, A Midsummer Night's Dream, Hello Dolly!, Joseph and the Amazing Technicolor Dreamcoat, Guys and Dolls, Grease, Once Upon a Mattress,, 12 Angry Jurors, Xanadu, All in the Timing, Much Ado About Nothing, To Kill A Mockingbird, and Almost, Maine. The musicals feature a live student band/orchestra previously conducted by Ms. George, several students, and now conducted by the Jazz Band director, Ms. Brown.

Alhambra also produces an annual "Talent Show of Fine Arts" called the Backroads Coffeehouse, which features paintings, music, dance, poetry, and more. Students who wish to take part in it sign up in the fall and perform near the end of the school year in the Performing Arts Building of the Alhambra campus. The Creative Writing Class spends some of the year designing the Backroads Magazine, a publication sold at the Coffeehouse that contains photos, poems, and other artworks created by students.

Notable alumni
 Robert Stephenson, MLB player (Cincinnati Reds, Colorado Rockies, Pittsburgh Pirates)

References

Sources
"School Accountability Report Card; Reported For School Year 2004-05"
"2006-2007 Course Catalog; Alhambra High School"
"USA Track and Field Coaching Education; Level 1 School"
"'Focus on Learning' Visiting Committee Report - Alhambra High School"

Martinez Unified School District
Martinez, California
High schools in Contra Costa County, California
Public high schools in California
1897 establishments in California
Educational institutions established in 1897